Enrique Urbizu (born 1962) is a Spanish film director and screenwriter. A native of Bilbao, he was one of the few Spanish film directors who brought the film noir into the late Spanish film industry.

Urbizu graduated from Universidad del País Vasco, where he did media studies.

In 2011 he won the Goya Award for Best Director with the movie No Rest for the Wicked.

Filmography
Films
 Tu novia está loca (1988)
 Todo por la pasta (1991)
 Como ser infeliz y disfrutarlo (1994)
 Cachito (1995)
 Cuernos de mujer (1995)
 The Ninth Gate (1999, script only)
 La caja 507 (2002)
 La vida mancha (2003)
 Adivina quién soy (2006)
 No habrá paz para los malvados (2011)
 Herederos de la bestia (2016)
Television
  (TV series) (2015; co-director)
 Gigantes (TV Series) (2018–2019; co-director)
 Libertad (TV Series) (2021; director)

References

External links
 

1962 births
Living people
People from Bilbao
Film directors from the Basque Country (autonomous community)
Spanish film directors
Spanish screenwriters
Spanish male writers
Male screenwriters
Best Director Goya Award winners
University of the Basque Country alumni